Kraków Cavalry Brigade was a unit of the Polish Army, created on April 1, 1937. Its headquarters were located in Kraków, but some units were stationed in other places:

 3rd Silesian Uhlan Regiment, in Tarnowskie Góry
 8th Uhlan Regiment of Duke Jozef Poniatowski, in Kraków
 5th Mounted Rifles Regiment, in Tarnów and after 1938 in Dębica
 5th Mounted Artillery Regiment, in Oświęcim

During the Polish September Campaign, the Brigade, under General Zygmunt Piasecki, was part of Armia Kraków, defending the area between Zabkowice and Częstochowa. In the first days of September 1939, its defence lines were broken by the 10th Army (Wehrmacht), with one of its regiments overwhelmed.  This opened the way for the German advance on Warsaw.

The battle took place around Zawiercie and Woźniki, and after the defeat, the Poles withdrew towards the line of the Nida River and to the towns of Miechów and Pińczów. The Poles were continuously chased and attacked by German 2nd Light Division.

On September 10, the Division crossed the Vistula near Baranów Sandomierski. Then, it fought in the Battle of Tomaszów Lubelski, in the area of Biłgoraj and Tarnogród. Surrounded by the enemy, it capitulated together with remnants of the Army Kraków.

See also
 Polish army order of battle in 1939
 Polish contribution to World War II
 Wołyńska Cavalry Brigade
 Mazowiecka Cavalry Brigade

References

Military units and formations established in 1937
Military units and formations of Poland in World War II
Polish Cavalry Brigades
Military units and formations disestablished in 1939